The 1975 ATP Buenos Aires was a men's Grand Prix tennis circuit tournament played on outdoor clay courts in Buenos Aires, Argentina. The event was part of the 1975 Grand Prix circuit and was held from 10 November through 16 November 1975. First-seeded Guillermo Vilas won the singles title.

Finals

Singles

 Guillermo Vilas defeated  Adriano Panatta 6–1, 6–4, 6–4
 It was Vilas' 8th title of the year and the 20th of his career.

Doubles
 Paolo Bertolucci /  Adriano Panatta defeated  Jürgen Fassbender /  Hans-Jürgen Pohmann 3–6, 6–1, 8–6
 It was Bertolucci's 5th title of the year and the 8th of his career. It was Panatta's 6th title of the year and the 11th of his career.

References

External links 
 ATP tournament profile

South American Open (Tennis), 1975
ATP Buenos Aires
ATP Buenos Aires
South Am
Davis